Rachel Kiwanuka, better known by her stage name Rachel K or Rachel Kay, is a Ugandan musician. Rachel K was born November 1, 1986 in Tulsa, Oklahoma. The daughter of Ugandan singer Halima Namakula, Kiwanuka has recorded several successful albums, toured widely throughout the region and collaborated with Ugandan and other regional artists. She has also worked as a comedian and television presenter, making appearances on such mainstream broadcasts as Jam Agenda and Tusker Project Fame.

Television 
Rachel Kay was a TV presenter on Top 8 Video Television show based in Los Angeles, California and later moved to Uganda and continued to present on the popular television show Jam Agenda on Wavah BroadCasting Company.

Rachel K was part of the Tusker Project Fame season 3 judges, alongside Sanyu FM Presenter Crystal Newman, musician Mathew Nabwiso, a lead vocalist with the Misty Jazz Band and Soul Beat Africa Band.
Rachel Kay hosted MultiChoice stand up comedy Stand Up Uganda in 2009.

Music 
Rachel K's mother, popular Ugandan singer Halima Namakula, signed her to her first record deal under her record label No-End Studios. There she recorded her first single "Every Time", produced by Henry Kiwuwa and Deno.
In 2006 Rachel K performed with fellow musician Iryn Namubiru during her Unplugged performance at Club Silk Lounge.
Rachel K collaborated with Rwanda's famous R&B artist Tom Close and she also had hits that had major air play on MTV Base 'Every Time' and 'I Love the way'.
In 2010 Rachel K was part of the group that recorded Pepsi's World Cup theme song "Oh Africa" featuring Akon, Keri Hilson and the Soweto Gospel Choir, written by the Hip hop duo Rocky City and produced by Prettiboifresh. In the same year 2010, Pepsi launched "Oh Africa", at club F1 in Uganda.
In 2011 Rachel Kay gave a farewell concert when she decided to go back to college in the United States and continue her studies in Fine Arts.
In 2012 Rachel K reached the second round of auditions for American Idol.

Discography 
Over years, Rachel K has featured a number of Uganda Known artists like Radio & Weasel, Young Nick, Iryn Namubiru, Cindy, Bobi Wine, Unique and Karyn.
 I love the way - Ft. Young Nick
 Liar - Ft. Young Nick
 Maisha - Ft. Karyn & Unique
 Unaniumiza - Ft. Radio & Weasel
 EveryTime
 Muyaye - Ft. Iryn Namubiru
 Feel Me
 Pinduula
 Love
 Is it me - Ft. Bobi Wine
 Home

Awards 

Won:
 2010 Diva Awards - Rachel K won Diva Awards International Female Artist of the year for the collaboration song with Akon and Keri Hilson "Oh Africa".
 2010 Diva Awards - Video of The year
 2007 Buzz Teeniez Awards - Teeniez fresh/breakout Artist of the year
 2007 Buzz Teeniez Awards - Teeniez Best TV Personality Of the year
 2008 Buzz Teeniez Awards - Teeniez Best TV Personality of the year

Nominated:
2011 Museke Online Africa Music Awards (MOAMA) - Voters Choice for 'Feel Me'
2012 EWorld Music Awards - Rock/Heavy Mental/Punk "Feel Me'

References 

1986 births
Living people
21st-century Ugandan women singers
American people of Ugandan descent
Musicians from Tulsa, Oklahoma
American television hosts
Singers from Oklahoma
21st-century American women singers
21st-century American singers
American women television presenters